A list of Bangladeshi films released in 1988.

Releases

References

See also

1988 in Bangladesh
List of Bangladeshi films of 1989
List of Bangladeshi films
Cinema of Bangladesh

Film
Lists of 1988 films by country or language
 1988